James Arthur Bennellick (born 9 September 1974) is an English former professional footballer who played in the Football League for Torquay United. 

Bennellick, a midfielder, joined Torquay United as a trainee, and made his Football League debut on 4 April 1992, playing as a substitute at Plainmoor against Stockport County. He went on to make several appearances for the gulls after spells at Watford and Brentford before finishing at gillingham f.c then moving into non league football  ]].

In May 1997 he was playing for Dartmouth United, but left to join Elmore in the 1998 close season. In July 2000 he left Elmore to join Devon County League side Dartmouth where he played alongside another former Torquay trainee Scott Kaasikmae. In 2004, he was playing for Launceston. In late 2005, Bennellick was appointed player-manager of Dartmouth, a post he held until May 2010.

References

Living people
1974 births
Sportspeople from Torquay
English footballers
Association football midfielders
Torquay United F.C. players
English Football League players
English football managers
Dartmouth A.F.C. players
Elmore F.C. players
Launceston F.C. players